Samoa competed at the 2016 Summer Olympics in Rio de Janeiro, Brazil, from 5 to 21 August 2016. This was the nation's ninth consecutive appearance at the Summer Olympic Games, although it had previously competed in four editions under the name Western Samoa.

Samoa Association of Sports and National Olympic Committee Inc. (SASNOC) sent the nation's second-largest delegation to the Games, tying its record for the most athletes with Los Angeles 1984 and London 2012. A total of eight athletes, five men and three women, were selected to the Samoan squad across five different sports; all of them made their Olympic debut in Rio de Janeiro. Among the sports represented by the athletes, Samoa marked its Olympic debut in swimming.

Four Samoan athletes were born and raised in the United States and New Zealand, having acquired a dual citizenship to compete for their parents' homeland at the Games. Among them were New Zealand-born flatwater kayaker Anne Cairns, discus thrower Alex Rose, sprinter Jeremy Dodson, and 18-year-old freestyle swimmer Brandon Schuster. Meanwhile, weightlifter and Commonwealth Games champion Mary Opeloge (women's 75 kg) continued the tradition of her family in carrying the Samoan flag at the opening ceremony, with her older sister Ele having had the honor in 2008 and 2012. Samoa, however, has yet to win its first ever Olympic medal.

Athletics

Two athletes was selected to represent Samoa at the 2016 Olympics. The first was Jeremy Dodson who was competing in his first (and only) Olympics. After formally representing the United States at the 2011 Pan American Games, he was selected to compete for Samoa by his parent side.

Track & road events

Field events

Canoeing

Sprint
Samoan canoeists have qualified one boat in each of the following events through the 2016 Oceania Championships.

Qualification Legend: FA = Qualify to final (medal); FB = Qualify to final B (non-medal)

Judo

Samoa qualified one judoka for the men's heavyweight category (+100 kg) at the Games. Derek Sua earned a continental quota spot from the Oceania region, as the highest-ranked Samoan judoka outside of direct qualifying position in the IJF World Ranking List of May 30, 2016. Sua was eliminated in the second round by Abdullo Tangriev.

Swimming

Samoa has received a Universality invitation from FINA to send two swimmers (one male and one female) to the Olympics, signifying the nation's debut in the sport.

Weightlifting

Samoa has qualified one male and one female weightlifter for the Rio Olympics by virtue of a top five national finish (for men) and top four (for women), respectively, at the 2016 Oceania Championships.

References

External links 

Olympics
Nations at the 2016 Summer Olympics
2016